Gary Browne may refer to:

 Gary Browne (basketball) (born 1993), Puerto Rican basketball player
 Gary Browne (footballer) (born 1983), Northern Irish footballer

See also
Gary Brown (disambiguation)
Garry Brown (disambiguation)